This is a list of museums in Russia. It includes details of museums within Crimean peninsula as Russia annexed the territory in 2014 and now administers it as two of its federal subjects, while no official transfer of property was agreed between Russia and Ukraine and Crimean peninsula is considered to be an integral part of that country under temporary occupation.

By federal subject

Arkhangelsk Oblast
Malye Korely: Open-air museum, featuring the traditional wooden architecture of the Arkhangelsk area.
Solovetsky Monastery contains a historical and architectural museum.

Astrakhan Oblast
Astrakhan Kremlin is a museum that exhibits the lifestyle of the Astrakhan military garrison and is part of the Astrakhan State United Historical-Architectural Museum-Reserve.

Buryatia
Ulan-Ude Ethnographic Museum

Chelyabinsk Oblast
White House, Kyshtym houses a museum with a choice array of mineral exhibits.

Chuvashia
Alikovo District Literary and Local Lore Museum
Chuvash National Museum: The largest repository of natural, historical, cultural and theological artefacts of the Chuvash people and other ethnic groups.

Crimea
Aivazovsky National Art Gallery
Feodosia Money Museum
Livadia Palace: Former summer retreat of the last Russian tsar, Nicholas II, today houses a museum.
Museum of Vera Mukhina is a historical and art museum in Feodosia, dedicated to the childhood, youth and artwork of sculptor Vera Ignatyevna Mukhina.
Naval museum complex Balaklava is an underground submarine base in Balaklava, Crimea, converted into a naval museum.
Simferopol Art Museum
Vorontsov Palace (Alupka)
White Dacha is the house that Anton Chekhov had built in Yalta and in which he wrote some of his greatest work. It is now a writer's house museum.

Kaliningrad Oblast
Kaliningrad Amber Museum is devoted to housing and displaying amber artworks.

Kaluga Oblast
Tsiolkovsky State Museum of the History of Cosmonautics

Karelia
Kizhi Pogost

Kemerovo Oblast
Tomskaya Pisanitsa Museum

Leningrad Oblast
Gatchina Palace
Mon Repos (Vyborg)
Priory Palace
Rozhdestveno Memorial Estate
Vyborg Castle

Mordovia
Mordovian Erzia Museum of Visual Arts

Moscow

Moscow Oblast
 Moscow Kremlin Museums
Abramtsevo Colony is a center for the Slavophile movement and artistic activity in the 19th century.
Central Air Force Museum
Gorki Leninskiye
Joseph-Volokolamsk Monastery
Kolomenskoye is a former royal estate
Kubinka Tank Museum
Melikhovo is a writer's house museum in the former country estate of the Russian playwright and writer Anton Chekhov.
Muranovo is a state museum dedicated to the life of Russian poet and diplomat Fyodor Tyutchev 
New Jerusalem Monastery
Tchaikovsky House-Museum (Klin)
Trinity Lavra of St. Sergius
Ugresha Monastery

Nizhny Novgorod Oblast
Pechersky Ascension Monastery

Novgorod Oblast
Borovichi Museum
Tyosovo Railway Museum

Novosibirsk Oblast
 Museum for Railway Technology Novosibirsk

Penza Oblast
The Museum of One Painting named after G. V. Myasnikov
Tarkhany

Perm Krai
Khokhlovka Architectural and ethnographic museum 
Perm Museum of Contemporary Art
Perm Regional Museum

Pskov Oblast
Mikhaylovskoye Museum Reserve

Rostov Oblast
Alferaki Palace, Museum of Local Lore and History
Bataysk Museum of History
Birth house of Anton Chekhov
Chekhov Gymnasium: Literary Museum named after Anton Chekhov
Chekhov Library
Chekhov Shop
Taganrog City Architectural Development Museum
Taganrog military museum
Taganrog Museum of Art

Ryazan Oblast
Khan's Mosque

Saint Petersburg

Samara Oblast
AvtoVAZ Technical Museum

Saratov Oblast
Radishchev Art Museum

Sverdlovsk Oblast
Irbit State Motorcycle Museum: Museum containing an extensive collection of production, racing and prototype bikes from the IMZ-Ural Factory as well as many foreign models from a wide range of manufacturers. The collection is unique in its display of the development of the Russian heavy motorcycle.
Irbit State Museum of Fine Art: Museum of Fine Art contains some important works including etchings by famous European artists.
Nevyansk Icon Museum: Private museum of icons in Russia. More than 300 Nevyansk icons of the 18th to the 20th centuries are on display there.
The Nizhny Tagil Museum of Regional History
Ural State Mining University
Sverdlovsk Regional Museum of Local Lore
UMMC Museum of Military and Automotive Equipment

Tambov Oblast
Ivanovka estate: Museum commemorating the life and works of the Russian composer Sergei Rachmaninoff

Tatarstan
Kazan Kremlin

Tula Oblast
Kulikovo Field: Museum dedicated to the Battle of Kulikovo took place on September 8, 1380.
Polenovo: Museum Estate of Russian landscape painter Vasily Polenov.
Yasnaya Polyana: Writer's house museum, the former home of the writer Leo Tolstoy.

Tyumen Oblast
Governor's Mansion (Tobolsk, Russia)

Udmurtia
Tchaikovsky Museum (Votkinsk)

Vladimir Oblast
Cathedral of Saint Demetrius
Cathedral of the Nativity in Suzdal
Dormition Cathedral, Vladimir
Golden Gate (Vladimir): Museum inside focuses on the history of the Mongol invasion of Russia in the 13th century.
Monastery of Saint Euthymius
Museum of Chocolate (Pokrov): Museum displays the entire history of chocolate for over 4,000 years and tells about the foundation of the Stollwerck factory launched in Pokrov in 1997.
Suzdal Kremlin

Vladivostok
Arsenyev Regional Museum
Fort No.7
Memorial S-56 Submarine
Military and History Museum of the Pacific Fleet
Museum of Archaeology and Ethnography
Museum of Automotive Antiques
Museum of the Institute of Sea Biology
Nostalgia Art Gallery
Paleo Village Museum
Primorye State Picture Gallery
Sukhanov’s House Museum
The Voroshilov Battery Museum
Vladivostok Fortress Museum
ZARYA Contemporary Art Museum
Zoological Museum

Volgograd Oblast
Old Sarepta Museum of History and Ethnography

Vologda Oblast
Ferapontov Monastery
Kirillo-Belozersky Monastery
Museum of Diplomatic Corps

Yaroslavl Oblast
Myshkin National Ethnographic Museum: Known as the Mouse Museum for its collection of 2,000 mouse-related items from all over the globe.

See also

List of museums
Tourism in Russia
Culture of Russia